Money Talks Downtown is a 1916 American short comedy film with an African American cast. It stars Jimmy Marshall and Florence McCain. It includes derogatory racial stereotypes and a storyline about a woman seeking money and a man lightening his skin color to try and make himself more appealing. It was produced by Historical Feature Films and distributed by Ebony Film Company.

References

1916 films
1916 comedy films
African-American films
African-American comedy films
Films about race and ethnicity
1910s American films